Catrijp is a hamlet in the Dutch province of North Holland. It is a part of the municipality of Bergen, and lies about 9 km northwest of Alkmaar.

The name already appears in 1680 as Catryp. This name refers to a strip of land along water, probably water in the dunes. The first part (cat) of the name is unclear and has multiple meanings. Catrijp has no place name signs.

References

Populated places in North Holland
Bergen, North Holland